The Very Best Of Beverley Craven is a compilation album by Beverley Craven, released in 2004 through Epic Records.

Track listing

 "Promise Me"
 "Woman to Woman"
 "Holding On"
 "Memories"
 "Joey"
 "Two of a Kind"
 "Love Scenes"
 "Love Is the Light"
 "Mollie's Song"
 "Feels Like the First Time"
 "We Found a Place"
 "Say You're Sorry"
 "Phoenix from the Fire"
 "Tick Tock"

 Tracks 1–7,9–14 written by Beverley Craven
 Track 8 written by Beverley Craven and Colin Campsie

Beverley Craven albums
2004 greatest hits albums
Albums produced by Paul Samwell-Smith
Epic Records compilation albums